Events from the year 1568 in Sweden

Incumbents
 Monarch – Eric XIV then John III

Events

 January - The Danes under Daniel Rantzau march toward Stockholm, but because of the lack of reinforcements, the Danish army turns back toward Halland. 
 May - Eric XIV recuperates from his mental illness and resume government.   
 4 July - The second, official wedding between Eric XIV and Karin Månsdotter.
 5 July - Coronation of Karin Månsdotter.  
 12 July - The brothers of the King, John and Charles, rebels against Eric XIV in Östergötland, and John is declared regent by the rebels.
 August - The Swedes takes Sonnenburg on Ösel from the Danes. 
 1 September - The rebels conquer the capital of Stockholm. 
 22 September - Jöran Persson is arrested and executed.
 29 September - The King is arrested, imprisoned and deposed by his brothers
 30 September - John III is declared King.
 30 September - Armistice with Poland. 
 autumn - Armistice with the Teutonic Order.
 18 November - Armistice with Denmark-Norway.

Births

 28 January - Gustav of Sweden (1568–1607), prince   (died 1607)
 17 May - Anna Vasa of Sweden, princess   (died 1625)
 25 June - Gunilla Bielke, queen   (died 1597)
 - Sigrid Brahe,  countess   (died 1608)

Deaths

 22 September - Jöran Persson, royal adviser   (died 1530)
 22 September - Anna Pehrsönernas moder, alleged witch (Born unknown date)

References

 
Years of the 16th century in Sweden
Sweden